Lebak Bulus MRT Station (or Lebak Bulus Grab MRT Station, with Grab granted for naming rights) is a rapid transit station on the North-South Line of the Jakarta MRT in Jakarta, Indonesia. Located in the South Jakarta, it is the terminus of the North-South Line, however the track does continue east, towards Lebak Bulus Depot.

This station is connected with TransJakarta Corridor 8 bus rapid transit route.

Location 

The southernmost station on the Jakarta MRT North-South Line, Lebak Bulus Grab Station lies within South Jakarta, Jakarta. More specifically, it is located on Jl. Lebak Bulus Raya in Cilandak.

This station is located near Lebak Bulus bus terminal, Poins Square shopping centre, and Transmart Lebak Bulus supermarket.

History 

Station layout

References

External links 
 
  Lebak Bulus Grab Station on the Jakarta MRT website

south Jakarta
Jakarta MRT stations
railway stations opened in 2019